Eureka Marsh (previously known as Palco Marsh) is an area adjacent to Humboldt Bay on the coast of the Pacific Ocean in Humboldt County, California.  

See also
Category: Marshes of California
Category: Wetlands of California

External links 
 Eureka Marsh: Coastal Conservancy Recommendations
 Eureka Marsh described and the controversy surrounding the habitat
 Future of Eureka Marsh (2002 article)

Marshes of California
Wetlands of California
Eureka, California
Landforms of Humboldt County, California